Transportation in Botswana is provided by internal and extensive network of railways, highways, ferry services and air routes that criss-cross the country. The transport sector in Botswana has played an important role in economic growth in the 23 years following independence. The country has been fortunate in discovering natural resources to finance economic developments, and sound policies have ensured that the transport sector grew at an affordable pace commensurate with demands for services.

Rail transport

Railways

BR Express 

All passenger services were discontinued in 2009, with the only remaining service being an international link to Zimbabwe from Francistown. Freight trains still operate. Passenger service was expected to resume in late 2015. Passenger services were later re-introduced in March 2016.

Freight trains 

Over half of BRs freight traffic is in coal, grain and intermodal freight, and it also ships automative parts and assembled automobiles, sulphur, fertilizers, other chemicals, soda ash, forest products and other types of the commodities.

Regional trains 
Botswana Railways run 2 nightly passenger trains, one from Lobatse to Francistown, and the other from Francistown to Lobatse, with stops in Gaborone, Mahalapye, Palapye, and Serule. The passenger train is termed the "BR Express" (Botswana Railways).

Commuter/suburban trains 
In Botswana, the (Botswana Railways) "BR Express" has a commuter train between Lobatse and Gaborone. The train is scheduled to depart in Lobatse at 0530hrs and arrive at Gaborone 0649hrs. This train return to Lobatse in the evening, well departing in Gaborone at 1800hrs. Arrival time at Lobatse is 1934hrs.

The train stops at Otse, Ramotswa and Commerce Park Halt.

BR Express Sleeping & Dining Department 

The BR decided from the very beginning that it would operate its own sleeping cars. Bigger-sized berths and more comfortable surroundings were built. Providing and operating their own cars allowed better control of the service provided as well as revenue received, although profit was never a direct result of providing food to passengers. Rather, it was for those who could afford to travel great distances expected such facilities, and favourable opinion would attract others to Botswana and the BR's trains.

Locomotives 

Diesel locomotives

As of March 2009:
 8 General Electric UM 22C diesel-electric locomotive, 1982.
 20 General Motors Model GT22LC-2 diesel-electric locomotive, 1986.
 10 General Electric UI5C diesel-electric locomotive, 1990.
 8 new gt142aces delivered in 2017 from emd.

Network 

total: 888 km (since 2015)
number of stations: 13
standard gauge: 1,067 mm (3 ft 6 in) cape gauge.

Railway links with adjacent countries 
Existing
 South Africa-yes- same gauge

 Zimbabwe-yes- same gauge

Currently under construction 
 Zambia- being built at Kazungula Bridge in Kazungula.

Proposed 
 Namibia 
 Mozambique

Road transport

Vehicle population 
 Botswana had 584,000 locally registered vehicles at the end of June 2019 - more than double the number from 10 years ago. This equates to around 250 vehicles per 1,000 people in the country.
 30,583 vehicles were registered in the first 6 months of 2019.
 Secondhand imports from Asia (and the UK) are a significant source of vehicles in Botswana.

Highways

A roads

B roads

Motorways 
Motorways in Botswana have a set of restrictions, which prohibit certain traffic from using the road. The following classes of traffic are not allowed on Botswana motorways:
 Learner drivers
 Slow vehicles (i.e., not capable of reaching 60 km/h on a level road).
 Invalid carriages (lightweight three-wheeled vehicles)
 Pedestrians
 Pedal-cycles (bicycles, etc.)
 Vehicles under 50cc (e.g. mopeds)
 Tractors
 Animals

Rules for driving on motorways include the following:
 The keep-left rule applies unless overtaking
 No stopping at any time
 No reversing 
 No hitchhiking
 Only vehicles that travel faster than 80 km/h may use the outside lane
 No driving on the hard-shoulder

The general motorway speed limit is 120 km/h.

Road signs 

Traditionally, road signs in Botswana used blue backgrounds rather than the yellow, white, or orange that the rest of the world uses on traffic warning signs. In the early 2010s, officials announced plans to begin phasing out the distinctive blue signs in favor of more typical signs in order to be more in line with the neighboring Southern African Development Community member states.

Interchanges

Existing 
 Kenneth Nkhwa Interchange at the junction of A1 / Blue Jacket Street and A3 in Francistown.
 Boatle Interchange in Boatle.

Under construction 
The Government of Botswana is building three interchanges along K.T Motsete Drive (Western Bypass) in Gaborone. This project started in August 2019, and deadline date is set 2022.

Longest bridges 
Botswana will have two longest bridges by span and the following are:

Existing 
 Kazungula Bridge in Kazungula.

Under construction 
 Mohembo Bridge located in Mohembo.

Roadway links with adjacent countries

Existing 
 Namibia by Trans-Kalahari Corridor.
 South Africa by A1 highway (Botswana), A2 highway (Botswana), A11 road (Botswana) and A12 highway (Botswana).
 Zambia by A33 road (Botswana).
 Zimbabwe by A1 highway (Botswana).

Mass transit

Taxicabs 
In most parts of Botswana, there are many taxicabs of various colours and styles. Botswana has no limitation in taxicab design, so each taxicab company adopts their own design.

Minibus taxis 

Minibus taxis, also known as Kombi, are the predominant form of transport for people in urban areas of Botswana. Most of them are found within cities, towns, major villages and even the least populated areas.

They also have their own minibus station within that particular area; they only transport people within that specific area, and all of them they have different routes. This is due to their availability and affordability to the public.

Most minibus taxis they do not have depart time that's allocated by the state and mostly of them they have 15 seaters. Currently, they're owned by many minibus owners.

Coach bus 
Coach buses are used for longer-distance services within and even outside Botswana. They're normally operated by private companies and they're the only ones that have depart time that's allocated by the ministry of transport.

All couch buses have different time for depart and they also have different routes, and they also have their couch bus stations all over Botswana.

Aviation 

In 2004 there were an estimated 85 airports, 10 of which (as of 2005), were paved. The country's main international airport is Sir Seretse Khama International Airport in Gaborone. The government-owned Air Botswana operates scheduled flights to Francistown, Gaborone, Maun, and Selebi-Phikwe. There is international service to Johannesburg, South Africa; Mbabane, Eswatini; and Harare, Zimbabwe. A new international airport near Gaborone was opened in 1984. Air passengers arriving to and departing from Botswana during 2003 totalled about 183,000.

International airports 
Botswana has 4 international airports. The following are:

Existing 

 Sir Seretse Khama International Airport in Gaborone.
 Francistown Airport in Francistown.

 Kasane Airport in Kasane.

 Maun Airport in Maun.

Proposed 
 "Mophane International Airport" is yet to be established in Palapye Sub-District near Moremi village.

Pipelines

Under construction

North-South Carrier 

It was done in phases. However, phase 1 was completed in 2000.

Phase 2 of the NSC, still under construction, will duplicate the pipeline to carry water from the Dikgatlhong Dam, which was completed in 2012.

A proposed extension to deliver water from the Zambezi would add another  to the total pipeline length.

Lesotho-Botswana Water Transport 
The Lesotho-Botswana Water Transfer is an ongoing project which is expected to provide two hundred million cubic meters per year to transfer water to the south-eastern parts of Botswana.

The scheme involves the supply of water to Gaborone from Lesotho via a  pipeline.

The project commenced on the 1 August 2018 and is set for completion in June 2020.

Proposed

Sea water desalination project 
The Government of Botswana intends to sign the Sea Water Desalination Project from Namibia. The project is at a tendering stage.

Water transport

Waterways

Ferries 

The Kazungula Ferry was a pontoon ferry that crossed the  Zambezi River between Botswana and Zambia.

Border posts 

 Bokspits Border Post
 Kazungula Border Post
 Ramatlabama Border Post
 Ramokgwebana Border Post
 Mamuno Border Post
 Pandamatenga Border Post

Infrastructure

Pedestrian elevated walkways 
Botswana has many pedestrian elevated walkways at different places.

Tour boats

See also 
 Botswana
 Sprint Couriers

References

External links 

 UN Map of Botswana
 Air Botswana UK - The national airline of Botswana